Team Israel has competed in the World Baseball Classic since  the 2013 World Baseball Classic qualifier round. In 2017 Israel competed at a World Baseball Classic qualifier for the second time, and for the first time qualified for the main tournament.

Prior to the start of the 2017 World Baseball Classic, ESPN considered Team Israel, ranked 41st in the world, to be the biggest underdog in the tournament, referring to it as the "Jamaican bobsled team of the WBC". Israel's odds to win the WBC were 200-1, before the tournament began. As the team began to win games at the WBC, its performance was described variously as a Cinderella story, a "David and Goliath" tale, and a baseball version of The Mouse That Roared. Israel beat all three opposing teams in the first round to finish atop the pool, defeating South Korea (ranked # 3 in the world), Chinese Taipei (ranked # 4 in the world; Israel's 15 runs were the most Taiwan had ever given up in a game in World Baseball Classic play), and the Netherlands (ranked # 9 in the world). Israel became the first baseball team to go undefeated in the first round of the WBC’s main draw after entering the main draw by winning in a qualifying round. Team Israel's catcher, Ryan Lavarnway, was named Pool A MVP. Team Israel qualified for the second round; Pool E in Tokyo, Japan, to be played later in March 2017. Furthermore, the team qualified for the 2021 World Baseball Classic.

In the first game of the 2017 World Baseball Classic second round, Israel beat Cuba (ranked # 5 in the world). In a rematch of their Pool A game in which Israel prevailed, the Netherlands defeated Israel, giving the team its first loss of the tournament, and then world # 1 Japan beat Israel.  Israel finished in third place in Pool E with a 1-2 record, and 4-2 (and sixth) overall in the tournament. Pitcher Josh Zeid was named to the 2017 All-World Baseball Classic team. 

Team Israel will compete in the 2023 World Baseball Classic in March 12-15, 2023 in Miami, Florida, against Team Puerto Rico, Team Dominican Republic, Team Venezuela, and Team Nicaragua.

Player eligibility
Under WBC rules, any player eligible to be a citizen of a country is entitled to play for that country's baseball team, even if the player has not obtained citizenship.  Israel's Law of Return gives anyone with a Jewish parent or grandparent, or who is married to a Jew, the right to return to Israel and to be an Israeli citizen. The WBC rules thus allow non-Israeli citizens of Jewish heritage to play for Team Israel.

In 2013, a number of Major League players of Jewish descent, including Ian Kinsler and Kevin Youkilis, publicly expressed interest in playing for Team Israel in the World Baseball Classic.  However, while some of the qualifying rounds were played after the conclusion of the 2012 season and included Major League players, Israel's qualifier was played in September 2012, during the Major League season.  Without its Major League players, Israel narrowly lost its qualifier to Spain (which had no Major League players at the time and thus was not affected by the scheduling).

Israel was put into the same position during the qualifiers for the 2017 tournament.  Three of the four qualifiers took place during 2016 spring training, and included Major League players.  However, Israel's qualifier took place in September 2016.

Record

Record by year

Record by team

2009 tournament bid
Israel applied to participate in the 2009 World Baseball Classic. In 2007, the inaugural season of the Israel Baseball League brought a large interest to the sport in Israel, causing Israel to apply to entry for the tournament. The Israel Association of Baseball (IAB) hoped appearing in the tournament would increase interest in the sport within Israel, in an effort to capitalize on the growing support. Israel had hoped that if the IBL was success they would be able to build a team with Israeli born talent. Marvin Goldklang, head of the IAB, however, talked about eventually having a team made up of Jewish Major Leaguers. Although not accepted in 2009, they were subsequently invited to participate in the newly created qualifying round of the 2013 World Baseball Classic.

2013 World Baseball Classic 

Israel competed in the 2013 World Baseball Classic qualifier. The qualifying round was held in September, while the Major League Baseball season still in progress, therefore it could not feature major league players such as those who qualified to play for Team Israel.

The team competed in the September 2012 qualifier, in Jupiter, Florida against Spain, France, and South Africa. Israel competed in their first qualifying match for the 2013 tournament on 19 September 2012 and defeated South Africa by a score of 7-3. Nate Freiman had two home runs in the victory. Israel's second qualifying match was against Spain on 21 September 2012, which Israel won 4-2. Nate Freiman once again homered twice for Israel in the victory. Israel's third qualifying match was once again against Spain on 23 September 2012, and lost 9-7 in 10 innings. With the victory Israel was eliminated from the tournament and Spain moved on to the next round. Although Israel had won their first two games they were eliminated due to the tournaments modified double-elimination format.  This meant that the final game was winner-take-all.

2013 qualifier roster

The players who qualified to play on the Israeli team included major leaguers catcher Ryan Lavarnway, first baseman Ike Davis, second basemen Ian Kinsler and Josh Satin, third basemen Kevin Youkilis and Danny Valencia, outfielders Ryan Braun (whose father is Israeli), Sam Fuld, Ryan Kalish, and Gabe Kapler, and pitchers Jason Marquis, Scott Feldman, Craig Breslow, and John Grabow, as well as what were then recent major leaguers catcher Brad Ausmus and pitcher Scott Schoeneweis.

Kinsler said: "Wow, I would be happy to play for Team Israel.... The truth is that if a proposal comes from Team USA to play for them, I will have a very difficult decision to make. Yuk [Kevin Youkilis], Braun [Ryan Braun], and I could make a fantastic team. I am sure that I'll talk it over with Yuk – we always laugh about things like this." Outfielder Shawn Green, who retired in 2007, was also eligible inasmuch as he is Jewish, and said in early June 2011 that assuming it works out, it "would be an honor" and he "would love to" play for Israel in the Classic.

The qualifying round was held in September, while the Major League Baseball season was still in progress; therefore, during Qualifiers 1 and 2 it could not feature major league players such as the above ones who qualified to play for Team Israel.  The lack of Major League players affected Israel far more than its opponents, none of which had players in the Major Leagues at the time. Kevin Youkilis announced that he would play for the team if it made it past the qualifying round of the 2013 World Baseball Classic.

The highest-level players involved in Qualifiers 1 and 2 were minor-league prospects.  Team Israel included minor league pitchers Eric Berger (1–0) and Brett Lorin, first baseman Nate Freiman (.417; 4 HR in 12 AB), second baseman Josh Satin (.273), shortstops Jake Lemmerman and Ben Orloff, and outfielders Cody Decker, Adam Greenberg, Ben Guez, Joc Pederson (.308), and Robbie Widlansky.  Also, retired former major league All Star Shawn Green played for Israel (.333).

In addition to Brad Ausmus as manager, the team's coaches included Shawn Green, Gabe Kapler, and Mark Loretta.

2013 qualifier results

|}

2017 World Baseball Classic

Israel competed in the 2017 World Baseball Classic, after winning the 4th qualifying round in September 2016. This marked the second time Israel competed at the World Baseball Classic qualifier, and its first time qualifying for the main tournament.

Israel's qualifiers took place in MCU Park, Brooklyn, New York, United States against Pakistan, Brazil, and Great Britain. Colorado Rockies coach Jerry Weinstein served as the team's manager. Israel swept all three games of the competition to qualify for the main tournament, first beating Great Britain and Brazil, and then defeating Great Britain 9-1 in the finals.

With the win, they advanced to play in South Korea, as the 16th and final team in the WBC. They were in Pool A, playing against South Korea, Taiwan, and the Netherlands.

2017 qualifier roster
Team Israel for the 2016 qualifying competition was assembled by Peter Kurz (President of the Israel Association of Baseball), with an informal team of baseball scouts and experts of Jewish baseball, including Scott Barancik (Jewish Baseball News) and Ephraim Moxson and Shel Wallman (Jewish Sports Review).

On August 15, 2016, it was announced that MLB veteran pitcher Craig Breslow would join the Team Israel pitching staff for the qualifiers. The official roster was released on August 26, 2016.  Israel's roster included 20 MLB-affiliated minor leaguers, making up 86% of the team, more than any other team in the qualifiers even before including recent Major Leaguers Breslow (an 11-year MLB veteran), Ike Davis, Josh Satin, catcher Ryan Lavarnway, former 15-year MLB veteran All Star pitcher Jason Marquis, Cody Decker, Nate Freiman, and Josh Zeid.  One of Israel's minor leaguers, Ty Kelly, had to withdraw from the qualifier after he was called up to the New York Mets. Additionally, 10 of the Israeli players had reached Triple-A.

The team's oldest player was pitcher Shlomo Lipetz, 37, who grew up in Israel and lives in New York. Lipetz is also the only player on the team with no current or past MLB affiliation. Team Israel's youngest player was pitcher Dean Kremer, 20, a Californian drafted by the Dodgers whose parents are Israeli expatriates.

Source:

2017 qualifier results

Israel, Pakistan, Brazil, and Great Britain played a modified double-elimination format."Israel Beats Brazil, Advances to Final of World Baseball Classic Qualifier", Haaretz Israel's schedule was set in a way that they would play the afternoon game on Friday, under any circumstances, in order to avoid the need to play on Shabbat, and the Saturday night game, should Israel need to play, would start after Shabbat was over.

Israel beat Great Britain 5-2 in Game One, with RBIs from pinch-hitter/DH Ike Davis and third baseman Cody Decker.Gameday | World Baseball Classic, worldbaseballclassic.com In addition, left fielder Rhett Wiseman singled and scored, right fielder Zach Borenstein had an RBI single, and catcher Ryan Lavarnway had three hits. Jason Marquis started and was removed after throwing 41 pitches in order to allow him to return later in the qualifiers. (WBC rules require four days rest after throwing at least 50 pitches.) Josh Zeid struck out six hitters in 3-2/3 innings of relief, and Craig Breslow got the win. Decker said: “I never played on a team with more than three Jews since Little League in Santa Monica.”

Israel beat Brazil 1-0 in Game Two, with Decker driving in DH Nate Freiman for the only run of the game. Freiman and shortstop Scott Burcham got the team's other hits. Corey Baker started and gave up one hit in five innings and was pulled after throwing 83 pitches, two fewer than the qualifying round’s single-game limit. Ryan Sherriff, Jared Lakind, and Jeremy Bleich pitched in relief, and Brad Goldberg picked up his second save.

Israel defeated Great Britain in the finals 9-1 on September 25, 2016. Starter Jason Marquis struck out five batters while pitching four perfect innings, and Josh Zeid pitched three shutout innings and was credited with the win. The pitching duo did not allow a hit through their 7 innings of play. Center fielder Blake Gailen broke the scoreless tie in the fifth inning with a two-run home run. Ryan Lavarnway and Cody Decker also homered for Israel.

|}

2017 main World Baseball Classic roster
Current major leaguers who were not able to play in September 2016 because they were playing in the majors, but who would be eligible to play for Team Israel in March 2017, included former All Stars outfielder Ryan Braun (Milwaukee Brewers; Israeli father), second basemen Ian Kinsler (Detroit Tigers) and Jason Kipnis (Cleveland Indians), and center fielder Joc Pederson (Los Angeles Dodgers)."Israel makes second round of World Baseball Classic," ESPN. Other major leaguers who would be eligible to play for Team Israel included outfielder Kevin Pillar (Toronto Blue Jays), third baseman/outfielder/first baseman Danny Valencia (Oakland A’s), shortstop/third baseman Alex Bregman (Houston Astros), and pitchers Scott Feldman (Blue Jays), Richard Bleier (New York Yankees), and Jon Moscot (Cincinnati Reds; on the DL at the end of 2016 season)."Jason Marquis pitching for Team Israel in WBC qualifier Thursday", SILive.com

In November 2016 it was announced that Jerry Weinstein would return as head coach. His coaching staff included Tom Gamboa as bench coach, Jerry Narron as third base coach, Nate Fish as first base coach, Andrew Lorraine as pitching coach, Tal Erel as bullpen catcher, and Alon Leichman as bullpen coach. Additional team staff included Barry Weinberg as trainer, Justine Siegal as mental skills coach, and Dan Rootenberg with Yoni Rosenblatt as the strength/conditioning coaches.

In January 2017 ten players with MLB affiliations were announced as Team Israel roster members, and traveled to Israel to participate in various events. The players included Ike Davis, Sam Fuld, Ryan Lavarnway, Ty Kelly, Corey Baker, Jeremy Bleich, Jon Moscot (did not play due to arm injury), Danny Valencia, and Cody Decker."For these pro-baseball players, visiting Israel is like coming home," Times of Israel. On January 12, Alex Katz officially confirmed his spot, as did Nick Rickels, on their respective Twitter accounts. It was later announced that additional players include Tyler Krieger, Dean Kremer, Jake Kalish, Blake Gailen, RC Orlan, Joey Wagman, Scott Burcham, and Gabe Cramer. Not one of its players was currently on the 40-man roster of a major-league team, though 10 of Team Israel's players had Major League experience and most of the others had minor league experience."Israel enjoys being underdogs in WBC 2017," mlb.com. For some of the ballplayers, including Ike Davis, Nate Freiman, Nick Rickles, and Josh Zeid, the 2017 WBC was their third appearance with Team Israel. Although Scott Feldman was originally announced as part of the roster, he later withdrew.

Team Israel was composed of players who overall have had a high level of education. Of the 36 players on the team's active roster or in its designated pitcher pool, 32 had attended university. Among those 32, two players attended Yale University, three went to Stanford University, two attended Duke University, two went to St. John's University, and seven attended a California State school. In addition, manager Jerry Weinstein had a UCLA master's degree in physical education. In contrast, as of 2012 a total of 4.3% of major league ballplayers had college degrees, and as of the prior year a total of 38% had played in college."NCAA and Major League Baseball relationship could increase baseball scholarships," Al.com.

Closer Brad Goldberg left spring training with the Chicago White Sox, and reliever Jared Lakind left the Pittsburgh Pirates, to join Team Israel in the second round of the 2017 World Baseball Classic, in March 2017 in Japan.Source: Mascot: Mensch on the Bench

Cody Decker brought the team's mascot with him to Asia from the United States for the WBC. The mascot is "Mensch on the Bench", a five-foot-tall plush stuffed toy that looks a bit like a rabbi or Hasidic Jew with a long beard and mustache who is wearing a tallis and holding a candle."Israel's Mensch on the Bench mascot at World Baseball Classic," Newsday."Mensch on a Bench, mascot of Israel baseball team, a hoot ahead of WBC,", The Times of Israel. "Mensch", in Yiddish, means a person of integrity or honor."Israel's World Baseball Classic mascot: Mensch on a Bench," Yahoo.

Decker said he "tried getting him a first-class ticket. But that didn’t fly, so he was put in a duffel bag and checked." The mascot proved to be a big hit, and the team takes him everywhere. He has his own locker, sits on Team Israel's bench in the dugout during every game, and sat alongside Decker at a press conference in South Korea. Decker said: "He’s a mascot, he’s a friend, he’s a teammate, he’s a borderline deity to our team.... He brings a lot to the table....  Every team needs their Jobu. He was ours. He had his own locker, and we even gave him offerings:  Manischewitz, gelt, and gefilte fish... He is everywhere and nowhere all at once. His actual location is irrelevant because he exists in higher metaphysical planes. But he’s always near." Manager Jerry Weinstein said: "He’s on the team. Everybody brings something to the team, and certainly The Mensch is a unifying factor for the ball club." Pitcher Gabe Cramer said: "The Mensch on the Bench is ... a symbol we can rally around as a team. We are proud to be Jewish, but we know how to make and take a joke, something Jews have a long history of doing. The Mensch is a great way to have fun in the dugout while reminding us of why we’re here and who we’re representing."

2017 main World Baseball Classic results
Prior to the start of the 2017 World Baseball Classic, ESPN considered Team Israel, ranked 41st in the world, to be the biggest underdog in the tournament, referring to it as the "Jamaican bobsled team of the WBC"."World Baseball Classic: Israel's Cinderella Run Forges Ahead After Upsetting Taiwan", Haaretz. Israel was the last of the 16 teams to qualify, was the only participant not in the top 20 in the world rankings, and not one of its players was currently on the 40-man roster of a major-league team (though most of Team Israel's players had Major League or minor league experience)."Israel's unlikely path to World Baseball Classic", USA Today.  In addition, ESPN ranked them 14 out of 16 in their power rankings. Israel's odds to win the WBC were 200-1, before the tournament began.

Following the World Baseball Classic, Josh Zeid was named to the All-WBC team.

Round 1 – Pool A

In their first game Israel defeated the Pool A favorite and 2009 silver medalist South Korea, ranked # 3 in the world, in 10 innings by a score of 2-1."Israel beats Taiwan, 15-7, at World Baseball Classic," The Denver Post.  Israel's winning pitcher Josh Zeid said the win was the pinnacle of his career: "This has to be it. This has to be the top, top win as a team, I think in my career. I’ve been lucky enough to be part of a couple of championships in the lower levels in the minor leagues and in high school, but nothing compares to this stage. Israel's third baseman Ty Kelly tweeted: "Definitely the most stressful game I’ve ever been a part of. But it was worth it." Israel's catcher Ryan Lavarnway noted after the win: "two generations ago, the way that this team was put together would have meant that we were being killed... It means a lot more than that we're here."

One day later, against Chinese Taipei, ranked # 4 in the world, Israel won again, this time by the score of 15-7. Israel's 15 runs were the most Taiwan had ever given up in a game in World Baseball Classic play. Taiwan manager Kuo Tai-yuan said of Israel: "That's a very scary team."

The following day, Chinese Taipei lost to the Netherlands, thus guaranteeing Team Israel a spot in the second round as it had one of the top two records in the pool. The second round will be Pool E in Tokyo, Japan, later in March 2017. It also automatically qualified for the 2021 World Baseball Classic.

Later that week, Israel went on to beat the Netherlands, ranked # 9 in the world and including a number of prominent Major Leaguers including Didi Gregorius, Xander Bogaerts, and Jonathan Schoop, 4-2 as Josh Zeid garnered his second save.. "Israel Goes to 3-0 at World Baseball Classic", The New York Times, March 9, 2017. Israel worked in nine pitchers during the game."World Baseball Classic 2017 scores: Israel beats Netherlands 4-2 to win Pool A; Tournament qualifier advances to second round with three straight wins,", SB Nation. In what NBC reported was thought to be the tallest batter-pitcher matchup in baseball history, the Dutch team’s  pitcher Loek van Mil walked Israel's  first baseman Nate Freiman.

Team Israel swept Pool A, 3-0, finishing atop the four-team pool, and outscoring its opponents 21-10."Israel improves to 3-0 in World Baseball Classic," ESPN. Israel became the first baseball team to go undefeated in the first round of the WBC’s main draw after entering the main draw by winning in a qualifying round. Following the game Team Israel's catcher, Ryan Lavarnway, was named Pool A MVP, after going 5-for-9 (.556/.692/.889), with four walks, a home run, and three RBIs.

Israeli Prime Minister Benjamin Netanyahu tweeted congratulations to the team for its "amazing journey," and the Israel Defence Forces tweeted its support.  At the same time, many were unaware Israel was competing, including Minister of Sports Miri Regev.

|}

Round 2 – Pool E

|}

Right-handed relief pitcher Brad Goldberg joined Team Israel in the second round of the World Baseball Classic in Japan. He had pitched in four games for the Chicago White Sox in spring training, and thrown 4.2 scoreless innings of relief. In addition, left-handed pitcher Jared Lakind joined the team."Jared Lakind to join Israel in World Baseball Classic", Pittsburgh Post-Gazette.

Writing for mlb.com, reporter Anthony Castrovince opined: "When Team Israel and magnetic mascot "Mensch on a Bench" surprisingly get a shot at the semifinals, we all get a little verklempt."

In the first game of the second round, Israel beat Cuba (5th-ranked in the world) by a score of 4-1. After falling behind 1-0 in the 2nd inning, Israel came from behind with one run in the 4th, two runs in the 6th, and one more in the 8th. Starter Jason Marquis (in 5.2 innings on three days' rest) and three Team Israel relief pitchers (including Brad Goldberg and Josh Zeid, who both threw 96 mph fastballs) kept Team Cuba to five hits and one run, a homer by Cuban star Alfredo Despaigne who became the all-time World Baseball Classic home run leader. Catcher Ryan Lavarnway had two hits for Israel.

"It feels like the World Series," said Team Israel Manager Jerry Weinstein, "but only bigger."

In a rematch of their Pool A game in which Israel prevailed, the Netherlands defeated Israel 12-2 on March 13, giving Israel their first loss of the tournament. Undefeated two-time WBC champion Team Japan then beat Team Israel, 8-3."Israel falls to Japan, ending miracle run at baseball tournament," The Times of Israel.

Israel finished in third place in Pool E with a 1-2 record, and 4-2 overall in the tournament.  Israel will not have to qualify for the 2021 World Baseball Classic, based on its 2017 performance.  USA Today opined that the team's performance might inspire other American Jewish major leaguers to play for Team Israel at the 2021 WBC. Following the conclusion of the World Baseball Classic, Zeid was named to the 2017 All-World Baseball Classic team. First baseman Nate Freiman wrote an article describing his experiences on Team Israel, entitled "The Mensches of March."

Heading Home: The Tale of Team Israel
In June 2018 a documentary was released entitled Heading Home: The Tale of Team Israel'' which dealt with Israel at the 2017 World Baseball Classic.

2023 World Baseball Classic
Team Israel will compete in the 2023 World Baseball Classic in March 12-15, 2023. It will play in Miami, Florida. Israel will face Team Puerto Rico, Team Dominican Republic, Team Venezuela, and Team Nicaragua. 

American-Israeli Ian Kinsler, a former Major League All Star and two-time Gold Glove winner, and Israeli Olympian, will manage the team. Among the players who have committed to play for the team are All Star outfielder Joc Pederson, Gold Glove outfielder Harrison Bader, outfielder Kevin Pillar, catcher Garrett Stubbs, and American-Israelis catcher Ryan Lavarnway and infielder Ty Kelly. Pitchers who will be on the team include Israeli-American Dean Kremer, Eli Morgan, Richard Bleier, Robert Stock, Jake Bird, and American-Israelis Jake Fishman, Zack Weiss, and Bubby Rossman, while Scott Effross was slated to be on the team but injured his arm.

Others who may possibly join Team Israel include All Star pitcher Max Fried, pitcher Noah Davis, pitcher Kenny Rosenberg, and outfielder Mike Moustakas. Third baseman All Star Alex Bregman has chosen not to play in the WBC, first baseman Rowdy Tellez has chosen to play for Team Mexico, and Adam Ottavino has chosen to play for Team Italy.

Brad Ausmus will be one of the team's coaches. He is a former Team Israel manager, has managed in the major leagues for five years, and during his 18-year playing career won three Gold Glove Awards for his defense. Kevin Youkilis will be the team's hitting coach. In his 10-year major league career, he won two World Series titles with the Boston Red Sox, was a three-time All Star, and won a Gold Glove Award.  Jerry Narron, who in his 30 year career has been as a manager or coach with eight different major league teams and been the third base coach for Team Israel at the 2017 World Baseball Classic qualifier, will also serve as a coach for the team. on March 13 purtio Rico one 10-0 over Israel while Israel never got a base runner. This was the first perfect game in wbc history

See also
List of Jewish baseball players
Sport in Israel
Baseball in Israel
Israel at the European Baseball Championship

References

World Baseball Classic
World
National baseball teams